The Mechanicsburg Commercial Historic District is a national historic district located at Mechanicsburg, Cumberland County, Pennsylvania. The district includes 91 contributing buildings in the central business district of Mechanicsburg. Most of the contributing buildings date to the 19th century and includes notable examples of the Late Victorian and Georgian styles. Notable buildings include two churches, two banks, and the police department.

It was added to the National Register of Historic Places in 1983.

History
The Mechanicsburg Commercial Historic District was added to the National Register of Historic Places in 1983.

Notable buildings
The Mechanicsburg Commercial Historic District encompasses 91 contributing buildings in the central business district of Mechanicsburg. Most of the contributing buildings date to the 19th century and includes notable examples of the Late Victorian and Georgian styles. Notable buildings include two churches, two banks, and the police department.

References

Historic districts on the National Register of Historic Places in Pennsylvania
Georgian architecture in Pennsylvania
Historic districts in Cumberland County, Pennsylvania
National Register of Historic Places in Cumberland County, Pennsylvania